French Woods Festival of the Performing Arts (or simply French Woods Festival or French Woods), is a private, co-educational performing and visual arts camp for youth aged 7 to 17. Located in Hancock, New York, French Woods is among the most prestigious summer arts programs in the United States. Established in 1970, it is one of the oldest individual-choice summer camps in the United States.

French Woods Festival runs one of the longest summer programs in American camping, running four three-week sessions, one week-long mini-session, and sponsoring a week-long adult camp at its sister camp, French Woods Sports and Arts Center. The primary summer schedule (the first four sessions) itself is among the longest in America, ending in the last week of August. Campers are not required to attend for the entire summer and are able to choose any arrangement of the four sessions they wish to attend.

French Woods Festival has prepared generations of prominent alumni in arts and culture, particularly in the performing arts. Alumni have either won or been nominated for a total of 40 Billboard Awards, 29 Emmy Awards, 26 Tony Awards, 22 Drama Desk Awards, 18 Grammy Awards, 7 Golden Globe Awards, 6 People’s Choice Awards, 4 BRIT Awards, and others.

In recent years, French Woods has premiered several amateur productions of Broadway shows, including Billy Elliot and Honeymoon in Vegas.

Program Overview
French Woods runs four, three-week sessions (e.g. First Session, Second Session, etc.) from early June to late August. An additional one-week session immediately follows Fourth Session. The program is modeled after the American university system, utilizing major-minor scheduling. The daily schedule revolves around three majors and three minors, beginning at 9:30 am and ending at 5:45 pm. French Woods offers nearly 400 individual majors and minors each session, stemming from over a dozen departments.

The camp and its activities are divided into three aged camps: Lower Camp (7–11 years), Middle Camp (11–14 years), and Upper Camp (14–17 years).

Each September, French Woods sponsors the French Woods Classic Band Festival, an adult band camp hosted by its sister camp, French Woods Sports & Arts Center.

French Woods administers the Hancock-French Woods Arts Alliance, a 501(c)3 nonprofit that primarily provides financial scholarships to a small group of staff pursuing education in the arts.

Location & Facilities 
French Woods Festival of the Performing Arts is situated on a small lake in the town of Hancock, New York, roughly two hours from New York City and three hours from Philadelphia. The camp is situated in the western Catskill Mountains near the convergence of that region and New York’s Southern Tier. The Delaware River (and thus, the New York-Pennsylvania border) is about 6 miles south and west of French Woods. The camp’s name is derived from the hamlet of French Woods where it resides. It is approximately 170 acres (68 hectares).

French Woods is home to five theaters, two circus pavilions, two music centers, two visual arts complexes, a costumes building, dance center, culinary shed, and a collection of fitness facilities including eleven outdoor tennis courts, an indoor skatepark, hilltop challenge course, equestrian stables, sports complex consisting of a gymnasium and sport-specific fields/courts, fitness center, and pool.

The property also has two administrative buildings, a dining hall, wellness center, camp store, and a canteen.

Notable alumni

Steve Augeri, former lead vocalist, Journey
Doug Besterman, Tony Award-winning orchestrator
Jason Robert Brown, Tony Award-winning composer and lyricist
Andréa Burns, actress
Jesse Carmichael, keyboardist, Maroon 5
Aiden Curtiss, model
Daniel Delaney, restaurateur
Zooey Deschanel, actress
Max Ehrich, actor
Melissa Errico, actress
Jon Favreau, actor
Barrett Foa, actor
Gideon Glick, actor
Ilan Hall, restauranteur
David Javerbaum, Executive Producer, The Daily Show with Jon Stewart
Adam Kantor, actor and singer
Cameron Kasky, activist
Adam Levine, lead singer, Maroon 5
Natasha Lyonne, actress
Tito Muñoz, Music Director, The Phoenix Symphony 
Benj Pasek, Tony-Award winning composer and lyricist
David Pogue, contributor, The New York Times
Zac Posen, fashion designer
Elena Satine, actress
Dan Schneider, Emmy-winning television producer
Max Schneider, singer-songwriter and actor
David Sheinkopf, actor
Iliza Shlesinger, stand-up comedian
Howard Stelzer, composer and owner of Intransitive Recordings
David Stone, musical theater producer
Jed Whedon, screenwriter and musician
Nat Wolff, singer-songwriter
Jason Wise, choreographer
Harris Wulfson, composer and violinist
Remy Zaken, actress

In popular culture
Camp'd Out: I'm Going to Performing Arts Camp is a documentary television movie in the MTV True Life series that was filmed in summer 2008 and first shown on April 25, 2009. Filmed in summer 2008, the film follows three aspiring Broadway stars through nine weeks of competitive drama at French Woods.

References



Arts festivals in the United States
Performing arts education in New York (state)
Summer camps in New York (state)
1970 establishments in New York (state)
Festivals in New York (state)
Buildings and structures in Delaware County, New York